The CSU Pueblo ThunderWolves football program represent Colorado State University Pueblo in college football at the NCAA Division II level. They have fielded a football team every year since 1938 with the exceptions of 1943–1945 and 1985–2007.

History

Championships

National championships
CSU Pueblo has won one NCAA Division II Football Championship.

Conference championships
CSU Pueblo has won eight conference titles.

 CSU Pueblo vacated their RMAC Championship from the 2015 season due to an administrative oversight which resulted in the use of an ineligible player.

Seasons

Head coaches
 Dale Rea (1938–1940)
 Jack Johnson (1941)
 Dan Lawrence (1942)
 No team (1943–1945, 1985–2007)
 Maurice Elder (1946–1951)
 Harry Simmons (1952–1955)
 Joe Prater (1956–1973)
 Mike Friedman (1974–1983)
 Gary Richardson (1984)
 John Wristen (2008– )

References

External links
 

 
American football teams established in 1938
1938 establishments in Colorado